Lester Goodel Hack (January 18, 1844 – April 24, 1928) was an American soldier who fought in the American Civil War. Hack received his country's highest award for bravery during combat, the Medal of Honor. Hack's medal was won for his actions at the Third Battle of Petersburg in Virginia, where he captured the flag of the Confederate 23rd Tennessee Infantry on April 2, 1865. He was honored with the award on May 10, 1865.

Biography 
Hack was born in Bolton, New York. He joined the Army from Salisbury, Vermont on August 27, 1861 and mustered into federal service on September 16 as a Private in Company F. On December 15, 1863, he reenlisted and was promoted to Corporal. He was wounded on May 5, 1864 at the Battle of the Wilderness. He returned to his company and on March 1, 1865, during the Siege of Petersburg, he was promoted to Sergeant.

After the war, Hack mustered out in Vermont in June 1865 and returned to his native New York. At some time he married Emma J. Burt (1849–1911). They had a son, Burt Lester Hack, who was a funeral director in Mechanicville, New York. He passed away at age 84 on April 24, 1928, predeceased by his wife and survived by his son. He was buried in Ticonderoga, New York.

Medal of Honor citation

See also
List of American Civil War Medal of Honor recipients: G–L

Notes

References

External links
 Vermont National Guard Library and Museum
 5th Vermont Infantry Portrait Gallery
 Vermont in the Civil War

1844 births
1928 deaths
American Civil War recipients of the Medal of Honor
Burials in New York (state)
People of New York (state) in the American Civil War
Union Army soldiers
United States Army Medal of Honor recipients